Ramon Antonio Peña (born January 9, 1982), is a Dominican former professional baseball pitcher.

He throws a 4-seam and 2-seam fastball, slider, and a changeup. Pena's slider is considered to have above average break, and his 4-seam fastball is better than his stats would indicate, judging by velocity and control.

Professional career

Arizona Diamondbacks
Peña was signed by the Arizona Diamondbacks as an undrafted free agent on June 13, 2002. Peña played under the identity of his nephew Adriano Rosario in his first two seasons of Double-A baseball.

He made his MLB debut on July 18, 2006. As a rookie, he went 3–4 with a 5.58 ERA over  innings. He struck out 21, while walking eight and giving up six home runs. After boasting a 1.04 ERA in the month of July, Peña struggled in August with a 6.59 ERA and September with a 9.82 ERA. In the last month of the season, he posted two scoreless outings over six appearances.

Peña made the Major League roster out of spring training for the first time in his career in 2007. He made his season debut on April 3 against the Colorado Rockies, tossing two scoreless innings of relief. He earned his first win on April 18, pitching a perfect inning of relief. He finished the month of May going 2–1 with a 1.88 ERA with three holds. Peña picked up his first save of the season on May 8 against the Philadelphia Phillies, second of career. He pitched 12 scoreless innings of relief from June 5 to 28, the longest streak of the season by a D-backs reliever. He ranks fourth in franchise history with 32 career holds and is second on the single-season franchise record list with 30 holds, 5 behind Brandon Lyon. Peña picked up his first Major League hit on May 25 against the Houston Astros, a RBI single to right field.

His 23 holds led the team and tied for fourth in the National League in 2008. His 55 career holds are second only to Brandon Lyon's 62 in team history. He recorded 5 consecutive holds for the second time in his career from April 21 to 30. Peña earned his first save of the season on May 16 against the Detroit Tigers.

Chicago White Sox
On July 7, 2009, he was traded to the Chicago White Sox for minor leaguer Brandon Allen.

He went 1–2 with the Sox in 2009 and a combined 6–5 with two saves, 55 strikeouts and a 3.99 ERA in 72 games.

On May 29, 2011, Peña was placed on the 15-day disabled list with right elbow tendinitis retroactive to May 28. He would later be transferred to the 60-day DL, where he spent the rest of the season. He was released by the White Sox following the season.

York Revolution
He became a free agent from the York Revolution after the 2016 season.

References

External links

1982 births
Living people
Arizona Diamondbacks players
Arizona League Angels players
Charlotte Knights players
Chicago White Sox players
Dominican Republic expatriate baseball players in the United States
El Paso Diablos players

Major League Baseball pitchers
Major League Baseball players from the Dominican Republic
Missoula Osprey players
South Bend Silver Hawks players
Sportspeople from Santo Domingo
Tennessee Smokies players
Tucson Sidewinders players
World Baseball Classic players of the Dominican Republic
York Revolution players
2009 World Baseball Classic players